William Bodrugan (died 1416) was an English politician from Cornwall, the nephew of politician William Bodrugan (MP fl. 1384–1401).

He was a Member (MP) of the Parliament of England for Liskeard in November 1414 and for Cornwall in March 1416. He was also justice of the peace of the latter county.

His son was the MP William Bodrugan, who represented Cornwall in 1420–1433.

References

14th-century births
1416 deaths
Members of the Parliament of England (pre-1707) for Liskeard
Members of the Parliament of England (pre-1707) for Cornwall
English MPs November 1414
English MPs March 1416
William
English justices of the peace